Zlatko Petričević (born 7 October 1961 in Bosnia and Herzegovina) is a Croatian football manager.

Career
Born in Zenica, Petričević managed several clubs in 13 years in Latin America and was president of Croatian side Pomorac Kostrena, but in April 2022 he was sentenced to a suspended prison sentence, because he physically attacked a photographer and verbally threatened a journalist in September 2014.

References

External links
 

1961 births
Living people
Sportspeople from Zenica
Croats of Bosnia and Herzegovina
Yugoslav footballers
Croatian footballers
FK Sarajevo players
FC Prishtina players
NK Bosna Visoko players
Stuttgarter Kickers players
Croatian expatriate footballers
Expatriate football managers in Germany
Croatian expatriate sportspeople in Germany
Croatian football managers
Independiente Medellín managers
Atlante F.C. managers
C.S. Herediano managers
FC Biel-Bienne managers
Croatian expatriate football managers
Expatriate football managers in Colombia
Expatriate football managers in Mexico
Croatian expatriate sportspeople in Mexico
Expatriate football managers in Costa Rica
Expatriate football managers in Switzerland
Croatian expatriate sportspeople in Switzerland